Kamińska is a surname. Notable people with the surname include:

Anna Kamińska (born 1983), Polish mountain bike orienteer
Ester Rachel Kamińska (1870–1925), Polish actress
Ida Kamińska (1899–1980), Polish actress and director
Julia Kamińska (born 1987), Polish actress